This is a list of the most notable films produced in the German Empire until 1918, in year order.

It includes German films from the introduction of the medium to the resignation of the Emperor at the end of World War I. Many of these films laid the groundwork for German Expressionism.

For an alphabetical list of articles on films of the period see :Category:Films of the German Empire.

1890s

1900s

1910-1914

1915

1916

1917

1918

References

1895
 
German
Films
German
Films
German
Films